Burro Island (Spanish: Isla del Burro, also known as Tacarigua Island) is a 247-hectare island belonging to Venezuela, located in the waters of Valencia Lake. It is the largest of the 22 islands in the lake. 

Administratively, it is part of Guacara municipality in the central Venezuelan state of Carabobo.

The island has an old prison that was used for many years in the twentieth century, but it was closed in the 1980s.

See also
Geography of Venezuela

References

External links
Location map

Geography of Carabobo
Lake islands of Venezuela